The Cry of the Weak is a lost silent film drama directed by George Fitzmaurice, scripted by Ouida Bergère and starring Fannie Ward. Astra Films produced and Pathé Exchange distributed.

Cast
Fannie Ward - Mary Dexter
Frank Elliott - District Attorney Dexter
Walt Whitman - Judge Creighton
Paul Willis - Budd

References

External links

1919 films
American silent feature films
Lost American films
Films directed by George Fitzmaurice
Films with screenplays by Ouida Bergère
American black-and-white films
Silent American drama films
1919 drama films
Pathé Exchange films
1919 lost films
Lost drama films
1910s American films
1910s English-language films